RC Antares is a Ukrainian rugby club in Kyiv. They currently play in Group B of the Ukraine Rugby Superliga. Web-page

Ukrainian rugby union teams
Sport in Kyiv